"Too Late for Love" is a 1983 power ballad by English band Def Leppard from their Diamond album Pyromania. When released as a single, it reached #9 on the Mainstream Rock charts.

Music video
The music video, filmed in December 1983, was taken from a Christmas music special called Supersonic. According to the text commentary in the video Historia, the performance was filmed after hanging out with Elton John and Meat Loaf over some champagne. The video, however, featured an edited version of the song with many sections of the song taken out including the guitar section starting at 3:28 in the original and ending at 3:38. The total length of the edited version is 3:23 while the original song is 4:30.

Track listing
 "Too Late for Love"
 "Foolin'"
 "High 'n' Dry (Saturday Night)"

Personnel

Def Leppard
Joe Elliott – lead vocals
Phil Collen - additional rhythm guitar, backing vocals
Steve Clark – lead guitar
Pete Willis – rhythm guitar
Rick Savage – bass guitar,  backing vocals 
Rick Allen – drums

Charts

References

Def Leppard songs
1983 singles
Songs written by Robert John "Mutt" Lange
Song recordings produced by Robert John "Mutt" Lange
1980s ballads
1983 songs
Songs written by Joe Elliott
Songs written by Steve Clark
Songs written by Rick Savage
Mercury Records singles
Songs written by Pete Willis